Chief Justice John Marshall is a bronze sculpture of John Marshall, by American sculptor William Wetmore Story. It is located at the Supreme Court, 1 First Street, Northeast, Washington, D.C. It was dedicated on May 10, 1884, by Morrison Waite.
It was relocated from the West Terrace, of the United States Capitol.

There are two recasts: 
at John Marshall Park, near Judiciary Square, C Street and 3rd Street, Northwest, Washington, D.C., 
and at the Philadelphia Museum of Art, 26th Street and the Benjamin Franklin Parkway, Philadelphia.

The inscription reads:
W. W. STORY ROMA 1883 
J. ARTHUR LIMERICK CO
FOUNDERS-BALTO-MD 
(Base, east side:) 
PRESENTED TO THE
CITY OF PHILADELPHIA
BY JAMES M. BUCK
1931 
(seal of the Fairmount Park Art Association) 
(Base, west side:) 
JOHN MARSHALL
CHIEF JUSTICE
OF THE UNITED STATES
1801–1835
AS SOLDIER HE FOUGHT THAT THE
NATION MIGHT COME INTO BEING
AS EXPOUNDER OF THE CONSTITUTION
HE GAVE IT LENGTH OF DAYS

See also

List of public art in Philadelphia
List of public art in Washington, D.C., Ward 6

References

External links

1883 sculptures
Artworks in the collection of the National Park Service
Bronze sculptures in Pennsylvania
Bronze sculptures in Washington, D.C.
Judiciary Square
Monuments and memorials in Washington, D.C.
Outdoor sculptures in Washington, D.C.
Sculptures of men in Pennsylvania
Sculptures of men in Washington, D.C.
Statues in Pennsylvania
Statues in Washington, D.C.
John Marshall
Statues of U.S. Founding Fathers